Gianpiero D'Alia (born 22 September 1966) is an Italian politician.

Biography
Gianpiero D'Alia was born on 22 September 1966 in Messina, Sicily. His father was the former Christian Democratic deputy Salvatore D'Alia. He has a degree in law.

He was elected to the Chamber of Deputies for the first time in the 2001 general election. In 2005 he became Under-Secretary to the Ministry of the Interior in the Berlusconi III Cabinet. In the 2006 general election he was re-elected as a Deputy, while in the 2008 election he was elected as a Senator in the constituency of Sicily.

In the 2013 election D’Alia was re-elected to the Chamber of Deputies and together with the other members of UDC joined the Civic Choice group. In December 2013, he and the others left the Civic Choice group to found the new group called For Italy.

On 22 March 2014, D’Alia was appointed as President of the Union of the Centre, after losing the race for the charge of secretary against Lorenzo Cesa in the fourth national congress of the party.

In 2015 he joined the Popular Area group, together with the other UDC deputies. On 2 November 2016 the national UDC secretary Lorenzo Cesa suspended D'Alia from the party and referred him to arbitrators, accusing him of highly offensive statements against the same party. He had declared a few days before "The UDC is dead". So D'Alia left the UDC to launch Centrists for Sicily, a new party formed in the Sicilian Regional Assembly. In 2017 he became the coordinator of Centrists for Europe, the new party launched by Pier Ferdinando Casini.

References

External links
 Gianpiero D'Alia

1966 births
Living people
Politicians from Messina
Christian Democracy (Italy) politicians
Christian Democratic Centre politicians
Union of the Centre (2002) politicians
Centrists for Europe politicians
Government ministers of Italy
Deputies of Legislature XIV of Italy
Deputies of Legislature XV of Italy
Senators of Legislature XVI of Italy
Deputies of Legislature XVII of Italy